Elmo is an unincorporated community in Dickinson County, Kansas, United States.

History

Early history

For many millennia, the Great Plains of North America was inhabited by nomadic Native Americans.  From the 16th century to 18th century, the Kingdom of France claimed ownership of large parts of North America.  In 1762, after the French and Indian War, France secretly ceded New France to Spain, per the Treaty of Fontainebleau.

19th century
In 1802, Spain returned most of the land to France.  In 1803, most of the land for modern day Kansas was acquired by the United States from France as part of the 828,000 square mile Louisiana Purchase for 2.83 cents per acre.

In 1854, the Kansas Territory was organized, then in 1861 Kansas became the 34th U.S. state.  In 1857, Dickinson County was established within the Kansas Territory, which included the land for modern day Elmo.

Elmo started about one mile from its current location, but the source of the name is unknown.  When the Missouri Pacific Railroad was built through the area, the railroad didn't like the Elmo location because it was sloping ground, so it built a station at nearby Banner City (current location of Elmo).  The old Elmo post office was moved to Banner City around 1887.  The name Banner City already existed in Jackson and Trego counties, so eventually the Elmo name replaced it.  The post office was opened in Elmo on December 16, 1884, and remained in operation until it was discontinued on May 6, 1966. The railroad was removed in the 1990s.

20th century
In 1899, Elias Sellerds discovered a well-preserved trove of insect fossils about 3 miles south of Elmo in the Lower-Permian Elmo-Limestone member of the Wellington Formation.  In 1925, Frank M. Carpenter begins studying the fossil bed.  In 1928, Robert John Tillyard researched the same fossil bed.  The Elmo site has produced tens of thousands of specimens, with more than 150 species of insects described, including large fossils of Meganeuropsis.  The site is located on private land and closed to the public.

21st century
In 2014, a group of locals adopted the Sesame Street character Elmo as its mascot to be placed on a new sign.

Geography

Education
The community is served by Chapman USD 473 public school district.

Gallery
 Historic Images of Elmo, Special Photo Collections at Wichita State University Library

See also
 Banner Township, Dickinson County, Kansas (location of Elmo)
 Mid-June 1992 tornado outbreak

References

Further reading

 Carlton Area History: Carlton - Elmo - Holland, Dickinson County, Kansas; Carlton Book Committee; Bell Books; 1995.

External links

 St Columba Catholic Church
 Elmo, Kansas, Kansas Ghost Towns
 Historic Images of Elmo, Special Photo Collections at Wichita State University Library
 Dickinson County maps: Current, Historic, KDOT

Populated places established in 1884
Unincorporated communities in Kansas
Unincorporated communities in Dickinson County, Kansas
1884 establishments in Kansas